Pioneer Island may refer to:

Pioneer Island (Nunavut), an island in the Canadian Arctic Archipelago.
Pioneer Island (Russia), an island in the Severnaya Zemlya group in the Russian Arctic.
An episode of the animated television series Tom Goes to the Mayor.